Parechovirus is a genus of viruses in the family Picornaviridae. Humans, ferrets, and various rodents serve as natural hosts. The genus currently consists of six accepted species. Human parechoviruses may cause gastrointestinal or respiratory illness in infants, and they have been implicated in cases of myocarditis and encephalitis.

Taxonomy 
Eighteen types of human parechovirus have been identified: human parechovirus 1 (HPeV1, formerly echovirus 22), human parechovirus 2 (formerly echovirus 23), and HPeV3 to HPeV18. A total of 15 genotypes are currently recognised.

Species 
The ICTV recognises the following six species:
 Parechovirus A (formerly Human parechovirus; human host)
 Parechovirus B (formerly Ljungan virus; rodent host)
 Parechovirus C (formerly Sebokele virus 1; rodent host)
 Parechovirus D (formerly Ferret parechovirus; carnivoran host)
 Parechovirus E
 Parechovirus F

An additional two species are recognised by Picornaviridae.com but not by the ICTV:
 Ljungan/Sebokele-like parechovirus (LCLPV) (falcon host, Hungary)
 Manhattan parechovirus (MPeV) (rodent host, United States)

Structure 
Parechoviruses are non-enveloped, with icosahedral, spherical, and round geometries, and T=pseudo3 symmetry. The diameter is around 30 nm. Genomes are linear and non-segmented, around 7.3kb in length.

Life cycle 
Viral replication is cytoplasmic. Entry into the host cell is achieved by attachment of the virus to host receptors, which mediates endocytosis. Replication follows the positive stranded RNA virus replication model. Positive stranded RNA virus transcription is the method of transcription. The virus exits the host cell by lysis, and viroporins.

Clinical information 
Human parechoviruses cause mild, gastrointestinal or respiratory illness, but have been implicated in cases of myocarditis and encephalitis. Human parechoviruses are commonly spread and more than 95% of human cases are infected early in life, within two to five years of age. Parechovirus B has been proposed as a zoonotic virus, associated with diabetes and intrauterine fetal death in humans. However, the data regarding these features are currently limited and need to be confirmed. Parechovirus is a Biosafety Level 2 organism.

History 
The first parechoviruses (E22 and E23) were isolated in 1956, and recognized as a new genus in 1996. Parechovirus B was first isolated from bank voles (Myodes glareolus, formerly Clethrionomys glareolus) in the mid-1990s. Human parechovirus type 3 (HPeV3) was found in at least 20 U.S. young infants in 2014. Those numbers include a set of identical triplets from central Wisconsin, who contracted the virus and were diagnosed nearly two months later after a flurry of tests, as this was the first known case in those health systems. The 2014 outbreak is a higher number than expected, and is thought to be linked to maternal-fetal transmission.

References

External links 
 3D macromolecular structures of Parechoviruses from the EM Data Bank(EMDB)

Picornaviridae
Virus genera